Park Hae-joon (born Park Sang-woo on June 14, 1976) is a South Korean actor. Park first drew attention as a supporting actor in the television series' Doctor Stranger and Misaeng: Incomplete Life both released in 2014, which led to him being cast in his first leading role in Jung Ji-woo's film Fourth Place (2015). He gained widespread recognition through The World of the Married (2020).

Filmography

Film

Television series

Web series

Theater

Awards and nominations

Notes

References

External links

 

21st-century South Korean male actors
South Korean male film actors
South Korean male stage actors
South Korean male television actors
Korea National University of Arts alumni
Living people
1976 births